Bally Creek is a stream in Cook County, Minnesota, in the United States.

Bally Creek was named for Samuel Bally, a county commissioner.

See also
List of rivers of Minnesota

References

Rivers of Minnesota
Rivers of Cook County, Minnesota